Dr. Death is a podcast produced by Wondery that focuses on egregious cases of medical malpractice. The podcast is hosted and reported by Laura Beil and premiered September 4, 2018. 

Season 1 tells the story of Christopher Duntsch, a Texas surgeon who was convicted of gross malpractice after thirty-one of his patients were left seriously injured after he operated on them, and two patients died during his operation. 

Season 2 focuses on Farid Fata, a hematologist and oncologist convicted for prescribing chemotherapy to patients who either did not have cancer or whose condition did not warrant chemotherapy. He pled guilty to charges of healthcare fraud, money laundering, and conspiring to pay and receive kickbacks.

Season 3 focuses on Paolo Macchiarini, a Swiss-born Italian thoracic surgeon and regenerative medicine researcher who became known for research fraud and unethical experiments in synthetic tracheas that led to the deaths of several patients, as well as the experience of his former fiancé Benita Alexander, who reveals Macchiarini's extensive fraud in their relationship in a series of interviews.

Episodes

Season 1

Season 2

Season 3 - "Miracle Man"

Promotion
Wondery promoted the podcast by renting ad space on a billboard directly across the street from Baylor Plano where Dr. Death subject Christopher Duntsch had worked. The billboard was covered up hours after it was erected by Clear Channel Outdoor after they received several complaints; Baylor Plano denied any involvement with the removal of the billboard.

Reception
Dr. Death received mostly positive reviews. GQ Magazine called it "The scariest podcast of the year." Season two of the show received the 2021 Ambies award for "Best True Crime Podcast".

TV adaptation

On October 3, 2018, it was announced that Universal Cable Productions had put the TV series into development. Happy! show runner Patrick Macmanus will executive produce and write the script.

See also
 The Shrink Next Door
List of American crime podcasts

References

External links
 

Investigative journalism
Infotainment
Audio podcasts
2018 podcast debuts
Crime podcasts
2018 podcast endings
Podcasts adapted into television shows
Medical malpractice
American podcasts